Harald Adolf Nikolaj Jerichau (18 August 1851 – 6 March 1878) was a Danish landscape painter.

Biography
Jerichau was born  in Copenhagen, Denmark. His father was the sculptor, Jens Adolf Jerichau, and his mother was the painter, Elisabeth Jerichau-Baumann. His younger brother, Holger H. Jerichau, also became a painter, while his older brother, Thorald Jerichau, was a composer.

He received his first formal drawing lessons from the architect C. V. Nielsen, then studied perspective at the Royal Danish Academy of Fine Arts in 1868. Later, he received lessons from Frederik Christian Lund and  Eiler Rasmussen Eilersen. Jerichau first exhibited in Copenhagen in 1873.

This was followed by a trip to Italy with his mother.
In Rome, he was a pupil of Jean-Achille Benouville, who  at that time, was director of the French Academy. After six months there, he made a study trip to Turkey and Greece, spent some time in Paris visited Switzerland and, in 1874, returned to Istanbul with his mother. During this time, he continued to exhibit in Copenhagen. 

Since he was a boy, he had been engaged to his cousin, Maria Kutzner (1851-1876), who was the daughter of his mother's sister. In 1875, she came to Istanbul and they were married. Their first child died at the age of three months. Believing the climate in Turkey to be unfavorable, they moved to Naples. A year later, Maria became violently ill and died in November, 1876.

In the aftermath of the death of his wife, he considered suicide but slowly regained his will to live. In 1878, just as he was beginning to restart his career, he died from a combination of typhus and "Italian ague" (malaria). He was buried at the Protestant Cemetery, Cimitero Acattolico at
Testaccio in Rome.

His mother completed  a remembrance, Til erindring om Harald Jerichau, which was first published during 1879.

In 1879, a small exhibition of his works was held in Copenhagen, featuring scenes painted in Turkey that had been commissioned by the brewer, J.C. Jacobsen. Among the works on display was The Plain at Sardes (1878) which had completed during his travels.

Selected paintings

References

Further reading
 Elisabeth Jerichau-Baumann, Til Erindring Om Harald Jerichau ), reprint by BiblioBazaar, 2014

External links 

ArtNet: More works by Jerichau.

1851 births
1878 deaths
19th-century Danish painters
Danish male painters
Danish landscape painters
Artists from Copenhagen
Deaths from typhus
19th-century Danish male artists